Gale Morgan Harold III (born July 10, 1969) is an American actor, known for his leading and recurring roles on Queer as Folk, Deadwood, Desperate Housewives, Grey's Anatomy, The Secret Circle and Defiance. He also starred in the romantic comedy Falling for Grace.

Early life 
Harold was born in Atlanta, Georgia.  His father was an engineer and his mother a real estate agent. Because Harold's parents were devout Pentecostals, he had strict religious upbringing. At age 15, he left the church.

Following graduation from the Lovett School, Harold attended American University in Washington, D.C., on a soccer scholarship. He began a Liberal Arts degree in romance literature, departing after a few months and moved to San Francisco, California to study photography at the San Francisco Art Institute. He worked a variety of jobs including construction, bartender, waiter, and apprentice motorcycle mechanic.

In 1997, Susan Landau, daughter of actor Martin Landau, suggested Harold try acting. He dropped out of the San Francisco Art Institute and relocated to Los Angeles, where he began a three-year period of intensive drama study. He was accepted into the Actors Conservatory Program with the classical theater company A Noise Within. In his theatrical debut, Harold appeared as "Bunny" in Gillian Plowman's Me and My Friends.

Career
In 2000, Harold was cast as Brian Kinney, a central character on Showtime's popular gay drama Queer as Folk.

During the summer hiatus from Queer as Folk, Harold made his New York theatrical debut in Uncle Bob along with George Morfogen.

In 2003, Harold starred in Wake, produced by Susan Landau Finch and directed by her husband Henry LeRoy Finch.

Harold had the lead role of Special Agent Graham Kelton in the short-lived FOX series Vanished in 2006.

Harold also guest-starred as Wyatt Earp in two episodes of the HBO series Deadwood and appeared twice on the CBS series The Unit. Alongside David Bowie, Harold was an associate producer of the documentary Scott Walker: 30 Century Man.

Gale Harold returned to the New York stage in Tennessee Williams' play Suddenly Last Summer on November 15, 2006, in the role of Dr. Cukrowicz ("Dr. Sugar"). Harold's co-stars in the Roundabout Theatre repertory production, a limited Off-Broadway engagement running through January 20, 2007, were Blythe Danner and Carla Gugino.

Harold was the male lead in the indie romantic comedy Falling for Grace, which debuted favorably at the 2006 Tribeca Film Festival (under the working title East Broadway). Harold played an eligible New York bachelor in an interracial relationship with an Asian-American woman.

Harold appeared in November 2007 in a guest role on ABC's Grey's Anatomy as Shane, a paramedic and white supremacist who is injured in an ambulance crash.

He appeared in Desperate Housewives on the fourth season finale May 18, 2008 as Jackson Braddock, Susan Mayer's love interest. Six months after a serious motorcycle accident, Harold returned to play Jackson on the May 3, 2009 episode of the show.

In January and February 2010, Harold performed alongside Denise Crosby and ex-model Claudia Mason in Tennessee Williams' Orpheus Descending at Theater/Theatre in Los Angeles. The production and cast received mostly positive reviews, with the Los Angeles Times calling his performance "brilliant" and adding "Harold, ideally cast, beautifully ignites with Crosby, whose unconventional interpretation is an affecting revelation."

In July 2010, it was announced at the Television Critics Association Summer Tour that Harold had accepted a recurring role as a law professor in the upcoming series Hellcats. The series concluded its season with Harold's character involved in an affair with the show's lead character Marti (played by Aly Michalka). The series was cancelled after one season.

The CW picked up The Secret Circle for the fall of 2011. The series revolved around a coven of teenage witches in a small town in Washington, each a member of a different witch clan dating back to the 17th Century. Harold played a scheming and powerful male witch who is the father of one of the teenagers. On May 11, 2012, The CW announced the cancellation of the series.

In 2011, Harold was also featured in two movies, Low Fidelity and Rehab, as one of the main characters.

Harold appeared on three episodes of the first season of the show Defiance (1.06, 1.08 and 1.09). On May 10, 2013, Syfy renewed Defiance for a 13 episode second season to air in 2014. Harold returned for a guest appearance in the second season of the show in the episode "Put the Damage On".

In 2013, Harold appeared in a short film, The Spirit Game. The film had its world premiere at the Cannes Film Festival and it was released online on September 2, 2014.

At the Rise 'n Shine Convention (June 9, 2013), Harold said that he was currently working on a project about Civil War, Field of Lost Shoes.

In 2014, Harold participated in different projects including the short film, Thirst, which was directed by Rachel McDonald and premiered at the Locarno Film Festival in Switzerland on August 7, 2014, and the film Echo Park, which premiered in the LA Film Festival on June 14, 2014. He also appeared in the sci-fi/action movie Andron.

In 2020, Harold became a co-founder of Filmmakers First Fund, a Los Angeles-based film fund and studio space dedicated to artists with full-length narrative and documentary film projects in the early stages of development. 2020 grantees included Rachel Lears for To the End (2022), a documentary following Alexandria Ocasio-Cortez, Rhiana Gunn-Wright, Varshini Prakash, and Alexandra Rojas as they fight for the Green New Deal.

Personal life
On October 14, 2008, Harold was hospitalized at the LAC+USC Medical Center after a motorcycle accident. He remained in critical condition after swelling of the brain was discovered as well as a fractured shoulder. Harold was subsequently released from intensive care and returned to complete his role on Desperate Housewives.  The online motorcycle publication Clutch & Chrome, which had followed his recovery closely, celebrated his new Hellcats role with an article on August 3, 2010.

During the shootings of Vanished in 2006, Harold shot a short video for the Amber Watch Foundation showing his support about missing children. In the video he stated that "nationwide 1.3 million children go missing each year" and urged people to be champions for child safety.

Harold is a supporter of the LGBT community. On July 16, 2012, at the first Annual Hot 100 Party hosted by the website AfterEllen, he recorded an It Gets Better video sending his message and advising gay teens to remember their heroes.

In 2014, Harold filed a restraining order against his ex-girlfriend, actress Danielle Saklofsky.

The actor's sexual orientation was the subject of speculation from the public for many years, until Harold finally identified himself as a straight man.

Filmography and other appearances

Movie

TV shows

Theater

Conventions

References

External links
 
 AfterElton.com: Documenting a Musical Outsider; interview with Stephen Kijak and Gale Harold
 
 Gale Harold the dream team 

1969 births
Living people
American Eagles men's soccer players
American soccer players
American agnostics
American male film actors
American male television actors
American University alumni
Former Pentecostals
Male actors from Georgia (U.S. state)
People from Atlanta
San Francisco Art Institute alumni
21st-century American male actors
American LGBT rights activists
Association footballers not categorized by position
The Lovett School alumni